Bryukhovetskaya is a rural locality (a stanitsa) and the administrative center of Bryukhovetsky District in Krasnodar Krai, Russia, located on the Beysug River. Population:

References

Rural localities in Krasnodar Krai
Bryukhovetsky District